East Quogue is a hamlet and census-designated place (CDP) in the Town of Southampton in Suffolk County, on Long Island, in New York, United States. The population was 4,757 at the 2010 census.

History 
East Quogue originally settled in 1673 and was known as Fourth Neck. In the 2010s, portions of the hamlet attempted to incorporate as a village. The attempts to incorporate the village failed in 2019 after the majority of voters within the proposed village's boundaries resident voted against incorporating.

Geography

Demographics

At the 2000 census there were 4,265 people, 1,660 households, and 1,133 families in the CDP. The population density was 414.2 per square mile (159.9/km). There were 2,465 housing units at an average density of 239.4/sq mi (92.4/km). The racial makeup of the CDP was 95.26% White, 0.70% African American, 0.07% Native American, 0.70% Asian, 0.02% Pacific Islander, 0.96% from other races, and 2.27% from two or more races. Hispanic or Latino of any race were 5.39%.

Of the 1,660 households 31.9% had children under the age of 18 living with them, 57.0% were married couples living together, 7.3% had a female householder with no husband present, and 31.7% were non-families. 24.9% of households were one person and 9.6% were one person aged 65 or older. The average household size was 2.57 and the average family size was 3.08.

The age distribution was 24.2% under the age of 18, 6.1% from 18 to 24, 29.8% from 25 to 44, 27.0% from 45 to 64, and 12.9% 65 or older. The median age was 39 years. For every 100 females, there were 98.3 males. For every 100 females age 18 and over, there were 97.8 males.

The median household income was $57,441 and the median family income  was $67,734. Males had a median income of $50,652 versus $37,115 for females. The per capita income for the CDP was $28,551. About 3.5% of families and 5.4% of the population were below the poverty line, including 6.4% of those under age 18 and 2.2% of those age 65 or over.

Notable people 
Laura Branigan, musician

References

External links
 East Quogue Chamber of Commerce
 East Quogue Union Free School District

Southampton (town), New York
Census-designated places in New York (state)
Hamlets in New York (state)
Census-designated places in Suffolk County, New York
Hamlets in Suffolk County, New York
Populated coastal places in New York (state)